Sulayman (Arabic: سُلِيمَان sulaymān) is an Arabic name of the Biblical king and Islamic prophet Solomon meaning "man of peace", derived from the Hebrew name Shlomo.

The name Sulayman is a diminutive of the name Salman (سَلْمان salmān), which both name stems from the male noun-name Salaam.

It may refer to:

Persons

Mononyms or honorific title
Solomon, in Arabic alphabet سُليمان pronounced Sulayman, king of Israel and a son of David
Sulayman ibn Abd al-Malik (674-717), famous Umayyad caliph who ruled from 715 until 717.
Sulayman ibn Hisham, was the famous Umayyad prince and Arab general, the son of the Umayyad Caliph Hisham (r. 723–743). He is known for his participation in the expeditions against the Byzantines.
Sultan Sulayman I, also known as Suleiman the Magnificent, longest-reigning Great Sultan of the Ottoman Empire, from 1520 to his death in 1566
Sulayman ibn al-Hakam, or Sulayman II or Sulayman al-Musta'in (died 1016), fifth Umayyad ruler of Córdoba, ruling from 1009 to 1010, and from 1013 to 1016
Sulayman ibn Abdallah ibn Tahir, ninth century Abbasid official from Tahirīd family in the service of the Abbasid Caliphate.
Sulayman of Mali, 14th century Mansa of the Mali Empire.
Sulayman the Merchant, explorer and trader who wrote on India and China
Sulayman al-Qunduzi, alleged author of Yanabi al-Muwadda 
Rajah Sulayman (1558–1575), the last raja or King of Manila.
Sulayman ibn Wahb (died 885), senior official of the Abbasid Caliphate serving as vizier.

Given name
Sulayman ibn Abdallah al-Mansur, was the early 9th century governor and politician of Arab Abbasid Caliphate.
Sulayman ibn Umar ibn Abd al-Aziz, was an Umayyad prince, son of Umayyad caliph Umar II (r. 717–720)
Sulayman ibn Yazid ibn Abd al-Malik, was an Umayyad prince, son of Umayyad caliph Yazid II (r. 720–724)
 Sulayman ibn Musa al-Hadi, was an Abbasid prince and son of Caliph Al-Hadi.
Sulayman Bal (died 1775), 18th-century African leader, warrior, and Islamic scholar, from the Futa Toro region, present-day western Mali
Sulayman Marreh (born 1996), Gambian football (soccer) player
Sulayman al-Nabulsi (1908–1976), Jordanian politician, Prime Minister of Jordan in 1956–57
Sulayman Solong, Darfuri sultan
Sulayman Pasha al-Azm (died 1743), governor of Sidon Eyalet (1727–33), Damascus Eyalet (1733–38, 1741–43), and Egypt Eyalet (1739–40) under the Ottoman Empire
Sulayman Pasha al-Adil (c. 1760s–1819), also spelled Suleiman or Sulaiman, Ottoman governor of Sidon Eyalet between 1805 and 1819, ruling from his Acre headquarters
Sulayman Reis (pirate) (died 1620), 17th-century Dutch corsair and later Ottoman Captain and Barbary corsair
Sulayman Abu Gayeth (born 1965), Kuwaiti regarded as one of Al-Qaeda's spokesmen
Sulayman al-Hawwat (1747–1816),  Moroccan historian, biographer and poet
Sulayman S. Nyang, professor of African Studies at Howard University

Middle name
Ali Sulayman al-Assad (1875–1963), leader of the Alawites in Latakia, Syria
Mohamed Sulayman Tubeec (1941–2014), Somali singer, songwriter and record producer

Surname
Hikmat Sulayman (1889–1964), Iraqi politician and prime minister of Iraq (1936 to 1937) at the head of a Party of National Brotherhood government
Muhammad Sedki Sulayman (1919–1996), Egyptian politician and Prime Minister of Egypt (1966 to 1967)
Tarik Sulayman, also spelled Tarik Soliman, most popular of several names attributed by Kapampangan Historians, to the individual that led the forces of Macabebe against the Spanish forces of Miguel López de Legazpi during the Battle of Bangkusay on June 3, 1571. Also known as Bambalito or Bankau by some historians, while others simply consider him "nameless".
Sulayman Al-Bassam (born 1972), Kuwaiti playwright and theatre director 
Sulayman Keeler, leader of Ahlus Sunnah wal Jamaah, a British Islamist organisation

Other Persons
Abu Sulayman Sijistani, also called al-Mantiqi (the Logician) (c. 932 – c. 1000), philosopher of Islamic humanism
Abu Sulayman al-Utaybi (died in May 2008 in an American airstrike in Paktia province, Afghanistan), Saudi Arabian Islamic militant, a critic of the leadership of the Islamic State of Iraq
Abu al-Rabi Sulayman (1289–1310), Marinid ruler of Morocco (1308 to 1310) 
Ibrahim Sulayman Muhammad Arbaysh or al-Rubaish (1979–2015), Saudi Arabian terrorist and a senior leader of Al Qaida in the Arabian Peninsula (AQAP)
Muna AbuSulayman (born 1973), Arab and Muslim Media personality, a founding Secretary General of the Alwaleed Bin Talal Foundation

Places
Sulayman Mountain (also known as Taht-I-Suleiman, Sulayman Rock or Sulayman Throne), World Heritage Site in Kyrgyzstan
Bani Sulayman, village in western central Yemen
Khan Sulayman Pasha, large khan in the Old City of Damascus
Plaza Rajah Sulayman, also known as Rajah Sulayman Park, public square in Malate, Manila.

See also
Solomon in Islam
Sulaymani, or Sulaymani Bohras (Sulaymanis) or Makramis, Musta‘lī Ismaili community that predominantly reside in Saudi Arabia (Najran), Yemen, Pakistan and India